Dina Matos (born November 5, 1966) is a former First Lady of New Jersey. She served as first lady during the administration of her husband, Jim McGreevey. In advance of an expected lawsuit, Gov. McGreevey, with Matos at his side, revealed at an August 2004 press conference that he had had an affair with a man and was resigning from office. Matos and McGreevey separated in October 2004. A divorce was granted following a trial on August 8, 2008.

Biography
Matos is the daughter of Maria and Ricardo Matos. They moved to the United States from Portugal when she was still young and settled in the heavily Portuguese Ironbound section of Newark. Maria worked in a gift shop and Ricardo worked for the railroad.

After graduating from East Side High School, she enrolled at the Newark campus of Rutgers University in 1984. She majored in political science, but also worked as a secretary while in college. Although she was enrolled until 1991, she never graduated.

Matos is a former manager of Public and Professional Relations at Saint James Hospital, and Executive Director of the Columbus Hospital Foundation in Newark, New Jersey.

Personal
Matos met McGreevey in 1996, while he was mayor of Woodbridge Township, New Jersey, and they began dating the following year, shortly after he lost his first bid for governor to Christine Todd Whitman. McGreevey had separated from his first wife, Kari Schutz, in 1995 and was divorced in 1997.

They married October 7, 2000. Together they have a daughter, Jacqueline Matos McGreevey, who was born prematurely in December 2001, after Matos had been hospitalized for six weeks.

Dina Matos married Paul Zuccarino in 2018.

Divorce trial
The Matos and McGreevey divorce and custody battle gained much media attention in New Jersey because McGreevey wanted full custody. Matos wanted $600,000 plus alimony. She was denied alimony.

The trial  to end their 3½-year separation started on May 6, 2008. Jim asked the court for equal custody of their 8-year-old daughter. Matos McGreevey  demanded $600,000 compensation. McGreevey received joint custody, and pays child support. They will also be using a parenting coordinator.

Career
Matos speaks fluent Portuguese and has worked to obtain green cards and naturalization for Portuguese immigrants. In June 2004, she was grand marshal of the Portugal Day parade in Newark.

Matos announced in January 2007 that she was writing a book, "Silent Partner", to end media speculation on her life. In the book, Matos wrote that she would never have married McGreevey if she had known he was gay, nor would she have "allowed a gay man to father my child," referring to their six-year-old daughter.
On May 1, 2007, the day of the book's release, Matos broke her silence and spoke on The Oprah Winfrey Show promoting her book. On May 2, 2007, she appeared on ABC's Good Morning America with Diane Sawyer and stated:

I thought I had it all, I thought it was the American dream, and it turned out to be a nightmare. ... You know he had the entire day [that he resigned] scripted. His entire life had been choreographed, and even as his world was falling apart, he was still trying to script everything and making sure that day went as he wanted it.

Gayle King interviewed Matos in the June 2007 edition of O, The Oprah Magazine.

References

External links

Portuguese emigrants to the United States
East Side High School (Newark, New Jersey) alumni
First Ladies and Gentlemen of New Jersey
People from Newark, New Jersey
People from Springfield Township, Union County, New Jersey
People from Woodbridge Township, New Jersey
1966 births
Living people
Rutgers University alumni
People from Cantanhede, Portugal